Altamonte Mall is a super-regional shopping mall located in Altamonte Springs, Florida, United States, a suburb of Orlando. Mall anchors are Dillard's, JCPenney, and Macy's with one vacant anchor once occupied by Sears, and other notable tenants are H&M, Forever 21, Apple Store, AMC Theatres, Pandora Jewelry, and Barnes & Noble. The center is the largest enclosed and conventional shopping mall in Seminole County and the third largest  in total by square footage in Central Florida behind The Mall at Millenia and The Florida Mall.

History

Altamonte Mall opened on January 1, 1974, with Robinson's of Florida, Burdines, and Sears—the same anchors Orlando Fashion Square had when it opened a year before—but Altamonte also had a Jordan Marsh store during its opening.
 
The first anchor change happened when J.W. Robinson's sold its Florida stores to Maison Blanche, which in turn then became Gayfers in 1992 when MB was bought out by Mercantile, which in turn was acquired by Dillard's in 1998.

Another original anchor, Jordan Marsh, was husbanded in 1991 because of Allied Stores as JCPenney set up shop a year later with Mervyn's taking over seven other Florida stores from Allied as a part of an $80 million bid.

Burdines merged with Macy's in 2003, and simply became Macy's in 2005.

In 2015, Sears Holdings spun off 235 of its properties, including the Sears at Altamonte Mall, into Seritage Growth Properties.

On June 28, 2018, it was announced that Sears would be closing as part of a plan to close 10 stores nationwide, making it the last original anchor to close. The store closed on September 30, 2018, and will eventually be redeveloped by Seritage Growth Properties into retail and hotels.

Aldo, Finish Line, and MAC Cosmetics closed in 2022.

Current anchors 
 Dillard's (former Robinson's, Maison Blanche, and Gayfers location)
 JCPenney (former Jordan Marsh location)
 Macy's (former Burdines location)

Former tenants
Robinson's (closed 1987, became Maison Blanche, now Dillard's)
Maison Blanche (closed 1992, became Gayfers, now Dillard's)
Gayfers (closed 1998, now Dillard's)
Jordan Marsh (closed 1991, now JCPenney)
Burdines (closed 2005, now Macy's)
Sears (closed 2018)

Junior anchors
 Forever 21
 H&M

References

External links 
 

Shopping malls in Florida
Brookfield Properties
Buildings and structures in Seminole County, Florida
Shopping malls established in 1974
1974 establishments in Florida
Tourist attractions in Seminole County, Florida